Tver is one of the major stations of the Saint Petersburg–Moscow railway located in the city of Tver, administrative center of Tver Oblast, Russia. It was opened on 1850 during the Russian Empire period.

Services

The suburban trains on the Leningradsky suburban railway line are terminated from Moscow Leningradsky. Long-distance trains also served this station within directions: Moscow, Nizhny Novgorod, Helsinki, Vyshny Volochyok, Likhoslavl, Zelenograd, Saratov, Tosno, Bologoye and Adler.

References

Railway stations in Tver Oblast
Cultural heritage monuments in Tver Oblast
Buildings and structures in Tver
Railway stations in the Russian Empire opened in 1850